Last of the Summer Wine's twenty-sixth series aired on BBC One from December 2004 through May 2005. All of the episodes were written by Roy Clarke and produced and directed by Alan J. W. Bell.

Outline
The quartet in this series consisted of:

Returning this series

PC Walsh (1988–1989, 2004–2010)

Last appearances

Ros Utterthwaite (2000–2005)

List of episodes

Christmas Special (2004)

Regular series

DVD release
The box set for series twenty-six was released by Universal Playback in October 2015, mislabelled as a box set for series 27 & 28.

References

See also

Last of the Summer Wine series
2005 British television seasons